Galsan Belikovich Bazarzhapov (born 1 November 1994) is a Russian recurve archer. He competed in the men's individual and in the mixed event with Ksenia Perova at the 2020 Summer Olympics.

In the world rankings, Bazarzhapov's career best result in Men's Recurve Archery was 2nd, which he achieved on 12 July 2021.

References

External links
 

1994 births
Living people
Russian male archers
Olympic archers of Russia
Archers at the 2020 Summer Olympics
European Games competitors for Russia
Archers at the 2019 European Games
Sportspeople from Zabaykalsky Krai
21st-century Russian people